Pelee Island Airport  is located adjacent to the west side of Pelee, Ontario, Canada. Approximately 5,500 passengers passed through Pelee Island Airport in 2009.

The airport is classified as an airport of entry by Nav Canada and is staffed by the Canada Border Services Agency (CBSA). CBSA officers at this airport can handle general aviation aircraft only, with no more than 15 passengers. The airport mainly handles propeller aircraft only with focus on private general aviation and regularly scheduled flights.

Terminal
A single storey yellow house serves as the terminal building and Canada Border Services Agency office. There are 3 other buildings around the small tarmac.

Airlines and destinations

Passenger

References

Certified airports in Essex County, Ontario